Romeo B. Lamothe (October 2, 1914 - November 23, 1991) was a teacher, military man, and  provincial politician from Alberta, Canada. He served in the Royal Canadian Air Force from 1942 to 1945, seeing action in World War II.

Lamothe served as a member of the Legislative Assembly of Alberta from 1961 to 1971 sitting with the Social Credit caucus under Premiers E C Manning and Harry Strom.  He did not seek re-election in 1971 .

Early life
Romeo B. Lamothe was born on October 2, 1914 in the hamlet of St. Edouard, Alberta. He took his post secondary education at St. John College and Camrose Normal School and became a teacher.

Lamothe joined the Royal Canadian Air Force in 1942 and saw action in World War II. His career in the Air Force ended in 1945.

Political career
Lamothe ran for a seat to the Alberta Legislature in a by-election held on November 27, 1961 as the Social Credit candidate in the electoral district of Bonnyville. He won the race easily with a landslide majority to hold the seat for his party.

Lamothe ran for a second term in the 1963 Alberta general election. His popular vote decreased but he still won a comfortable plurality to hold the district.

Lamothe ran his third term in office in the 1967 Alberta general election. He held his seat in a hotly contested race against Vic Justik for the second election in a row. Justik ran as a Coalition candidate being nominated by both the Liberals and Progressive Conservatives.

Lamothe retired from the assembly at dissolution in 1971.

Late life
After leaving public office, Lamothe donated the documents from his political career to the Alberta Provincial Archives in 1973. Lamothe died on November 23, 1991.

References

External links
Legislative Assembly of Alberta Members Listing

1914 births
1991 deaths
Alberta Social Credit Party MLAs
Canadian military personnel of World War II
Franco-Albertan people